John Calvin Coolidge Sr. (March 31, 1845 – March 18, 1926) was an American politician and businessman from Vermont, and the father of Calvin Coolidge, the 30th president of the United States. The senior Coolidge administered the presidential oath of office to his son at their family homestead in the early morning hours of August 3, 1923, following the death of President Warren G. Harding.

Born in Plymouth, Vermont, John C. Coolidge was a farmer and store owner, and worked at a variety of other occupations, including banker and insurance broker.  In addition, he was a veteran of the Vermont militia, and held the law enforcement posts of town constable and county deputy sheriff.  A prominent local leader, he served in numerous Plymouth town offices, and was elected to terms in both the Vermont House of Representatives and Vermont Senate.

John C. Coolidge remained active in his farming and business interests until his death in Plymouth in 1926; he was buried in Plymouth Notch at a village cemetery where several generations of his family are also buried.

Political and business career

Coolidge was born in Plymouth, Vermont on March 31, 1845, the son of Calvin Galusha Coolidge and Sarah Coolidge. Calvin G. Coolidge was a farmer, and also served in the Vermont House of Representatives.  John Coolidge graduated from Black River Academy, and served in Vermont during the American Civil War as commander of the state militia's Company K, 10th Regiment with the rank of captain.

Early in his life, Coolidge worked as a woodcutter and wheelwright.  He was later active in several occupations; a partial list includes farmer, blacksmith, bricklayer, mason, carriage maker, harness maker, teacher, store owner, and insurance broker.  In addition, he was a vice president of the Ludlow Savings Bank & Trust Company, and was appointed to its board of directors.  Coolidge also served on the Black River Academy board of trustees.

A Republican, Coolidge served in the Vermont House of Representatives from 1872 to 1878.  He held local offices throughout his life, including town selectboard member, town meeting moderator, town agent, tax collector, road commissioner, school superintendent, justice of the peace, and notary public.  For several years, he was Plymouth's assistant postmaster, with a long running joke in the town being that Coolidge held this position because he was the only person in Plymouth who knew how to complete the forms required when submitting the post office's annual report to the main office in Washington, DC.  For nearly 40 years he was both a town constable and deputy sheriff of Windsor County.

During the 1900 to 1902 governorship of William W. Stickney, who was related to the Coolidge family, John Coolidge served on his military staff as aide-de-camp with the rank of colonel.

Coolidge served in the Vermont Senate from 1910 to 1912.  During his Senate term, Coolidge was chairman of the Committee on Land Taxes.

Inaugurating his son

Upon hearing the death of President Warren G. Harding the previous day, Coolidge, who was a Vermont justice of the peace and a notary public, administered the presidential oath of office to his son at the Coolidge Homestead in Plymouth Notch, Vermont, at about 2:30 a.m. on August 3, 1923.

Death
He was buried at Plymouth Notch Cemetery.

Family

In 1868, Coolidge married Victoria Josephine Moor (born 1846). They were the parents of two children, son Calvin, and daughter Abigail (1875–1890).  Victoria died in 1885, aged 39.

Coolidge married Caroline Athelia Brown (1857–1920) on September 9, 1891.

Notes

Sources

Books

Internet

Newspapers

External links

1845 births
1926 deaths
People from Plymouth, Vermont
People of Vermont in the American Civil War
Coolidge family
Fathers of presidents of the United States
Fathers of vice presidents of the United States
School board members in Vermont
Republican Party members of the Vermont House of Representatives
Republican Party Vermont state senators
American notaries
Calvin Coolidge
Businesspeople from Vermont
Farmers from Vermont
19th-century American politicians
20th-century American politicians
Burials in Vermont